Ameerega pulchripecta, formerly Epipedobates pulchripecta, is a species of frog in the family Dendrobatidae endemic to Brazil. Its natural habitats are subtropical or tropical moist lowland forests and intermittent freshwater marshes. It is threatened by habitat loss.

References

pulchripecta
Endemic fauna of Brazil
Amphibians described in 1976
Taxonomy articles created by Polbot